Austin William Aviza (born February 17, 1997) is an American professional soccer player who plays as a goalkeeper.

Early life
Born in Medway, Massachusetts, Aviza started his prep career at Medway High School and earned the Tri-Valley League rookie of the year award. A member of the New England Revolution Academy U16 team at the time, Aviza was invited to be part of the senior team's preseason training camp held in Tucson, Arizona, in February 2014.

College
Aviza began his college soccer career in 2015 at Syracuse University, starting the first nine matches of the 2015 season for Syracuse Orange after Alex Bono had left school early to be drafted in 2015 and sophomore backup Hendrik Hilpert picked up an injury in preseason. Aviza recorded three shutouts before Hilpert returned to fitness and claimed the starting job with Aviza failing to make another appearance during his two years at Syracuse. In January 2017, Aviza transferred to the University of Connecticut but did not see playing time in the 2017 season. In 2018 he appeared in 14 games for the UConn Huskies, registering five shutouts and even tallied an assist on the 88th game-winner in UConn's 2–1 win over Temple on October 20. In 2019, Aviza again transferred, this time to Providence College where he began working towards a master's degree in economics while also completing his final year of NCAA eligibility. Aviza kepts 11 shutouts in 23 appearances for Providence Friars, helping his team reach the third round of the 2019 NCAA Division I Men's Soccer Tournament before losing to #2 ranked Clemson in overtime.

Club career

Orlando City B
Aviza was selected in the second round (44th overall) of the 2020 MLS SuperDraft by Orlando City. In March 2020, he signed a professional contract with Orlando City B, the team's USL League One affiliate. On August 1, 2020, he made his debut in the season opener against Tormenta FC, losing 2–0 but making seven saves and winning the save of the week award. He kept his first shutout for the club the following week in a 2–0 victory over New England Revolution II. He made eleven appearances before being released at the end of the season.

Richmond Kickers
On February 15, 2021, Aviza joined USL League One side Richmond Kickers.

International
In 2013, Aviza was called up to the United States under-17 and United States under-18 national teams.

References

External links

Providence profile
UConn profile

1997 births
Living people
People from Medway, Massachusetts
Soccer players from Massachusetts
Association football goalkeepers
American soccer players
Orlando City SC draft picks
Orlando City B players
Richmond Kickers players
USL League One players
Syracuse Orange men's soccer players
UConn Huskies men's soccer players
Providence Friars men's soccer players
Sportspeople from Norfolk County, Massachusetts